Phi Beta Mu, International Bandmasters' Fraternity, is an honorary fraternity for band directors. The fraternity was designed to honor outstanding band directors at the state level, with only one potential chapter per state. There are currently 35 active chapters in the United States and Canada.

Awards
These awards that are given to outstanding bands and band directors every year for appreciation of their hard work.
Earl D. Irons Program of Distinction, the most notable award given to the highly advanced bands
The 2016 receivers of this award are the Penn High School Band from Mishawaka, Indiana directed by Glenn Northern and the Westlake High School Band from Austin, Texas directed by Kerry Taylor.
The 2017 recipient of this award was the Plano East Senior High School Band, from Plano, Texas, under the direction of Evelio Villarreal.
Outstanding Bandmasters, awarded to outstanding band directors of militaries, universities, and high schools
The 2017 receiver of this award is Jerry Junkin, the director of bands at the University of Texas.
Outstanding Contributor, awarded to outstanding assistant band directors 
The 2017 receiver for this award is Dennis Fisher, who is currently a guest director of the Volga Band in Saratov, Russia.

References

External links

Fraternities and sororities in Canada
Fraternities and sororities in the United States
Student organizations established in 1937
1939 establishments in Texas